The following radio stations broadcast on FM frequency 94.5 MHz:

Argentina

 Radio María in Chascomús, Buenos Aires
 Radio María in Caleta Olivia, Santa Cruz
 Radio María in Río Gallegos, Santa Cruz

Australia

 2FBI in Sydney, New South Wales
 SBS Radio in Lightning Ridge, New South Wales
 ZFM in Newcastle, New South Wales
 8KNB in Darwin, Northern Territory
 3RPH Warrnambool in Warrnambool, Victoria
 Triple J in Shepparton, Victoria
 ABC Classic FM in Albany, Western Australia
 6MIX in Perth, Western Australia

Canada (Channel 233)

 CBGA-13-FM in Gros Morne, Quebec
 CBUQ-FM in Radium Hot Springs, British Columbia
 CBWJ-FM in The Pas, Manitoba
 CBWP-FM in Leaf Rapids, Manitoba
 CFBT-FM in Vancouver, British Columbia
 CFWE-FM-5 in Fort McMurray, Alberta
 CFWH-FM in Whitehorse, Yukon
 CHAT-FM in Medicine Hat, Alberta
 CHBW-FM in Rocky Mountain House, Alberta
 CHET-FM in Chetwynd, British Columbia
 CHTR-FM in Drumheller, Alberta
 CIBU-FM in Wingham, Ontario
 CIIB-FM in Brockville, Ontario
 CITE-FM-2 in Sherbrooke, Quebec
 CJAB-FM in Chicoutimi, Quebec
 CJFO-FM in Ottawa, Ontario
 CJRG-FM in Gaspe, Quebec
 CKBW-1-FM in Liverpool, Nova Scotia
 CKCK-FM in Regina, Saskatchewan
 CKCW-FM in Moncton, New Brunswick
 CKHT-FM in Hearst, Ontario

China 

 Beijing News Radio in Beijing

Malaysia
 Mix in Klang Valley

Mexico

XHA-FM in Tijuana, Baja California
XHBJ-FM in Ciudad Victoria, Tamaulipas
XHCAB-FM in Caborca, Sonora
XHCDS-FM in Ciudad Delicias, Chihuahua
XHEEM-FM in Ríoverde, San Luis Potosí
XHGES-FM in Culiacán, Sinaloa
XHGVE-FM in Guasave, Sinaloa
XHIMER-FM in Mexico City
XHMIN-FM in Tizimín, Yucatán
XHNU-FM in Acapulco, Guerrero
XHPTAC-FM in Tacámbaro, Michoacán
XHSTH-FM in Santa María Tlahuitoltepec, Oaxaca
XHTA-FM in Piedras Negras, Coahuila
XHTPO-FM in Tampico, Tamaulipas
XHUAA-FM in Aguascalientes, Aguascalientes
XHVG-FM in Mérida, Yucatán
XHYV-FM in Fortín, Veracruz

Panama
W Radio Panama in Panama City

Sierra Leone
 BBC World Service in Bo

South Africa
 KFM (Cape Town) in Cape Town

United Kingdom
 BBC Radio Ulster in Northern Ireland

United States (Channel 233)

 KATS in Yakima, Washington
 KAWJ in Coarsegold, California
  in Gilroy, California
 KBCT in Waco, Texas
 KBFE-LP in Bakersfield, California
 KCGC in Merino, Colorado
 KCNO in Alturas, California
 KDLB in Frazee, Minnesota
 KDNT in Oakwood, Texas
 KEMA (FM) in Three Rivers, Texas
 KEMX in Locust Grove, Oklahoma
  in Lubbock, Texas
  in Barling, Arkansas
 KFRQ in Harlingen, Texas
 KFSS-LP in Joplin, Missouri
  in Hanford, California
 KGWD in Sioux Falls, South Dakota
  in Hayden, Idaho
 KJDY-FM in Canyon City, Oregon
 KJIW-FM in Helena, Arkansas
 KKAS-LP in Tafuna, American Samoa
  in Fort Dodge, Iowa
  in Poplar Bluff, Missouri
 KLGL in Salina, Utah
  in Hastings, Nebraska
 KLYK in Kelso, Washington
 KMGE in Eugene, Oregon
  in Casper, Wyoming
  in Great Falls, Montana
 KMYT (FM) in Temecula, California
  in Phoenix, Arizona
  in Reliance, South Dakota
 KPMI-FM in Baudette, Minnesota
  in Bismarck, North Dakota
 KRGQ in Yuma, Colorado
  in Shreveport, Louisiana
 KRXL in Kirksville, Missouri
 KRXY in Shelton, Washington
  in Brawley, California
 KSKI-FM in Sun Valley, Idaho
  in Scott City, Kansas
 KSMB (FM) in Lafayette, Louisiana
 KSOC in Tipton, Oklahoma
 KSPE in Ellwood, California
  in Saint Paul, Minnesota
  in Houston, Texas
 KTHX-FM in Sun Valley, Nevada
 KTUN in New Castle, Colorado
 KULT-LP in Cedar Falls, Iowa
 KUOL in Elko, Nevada
 KVBB-LP in Big Bear Lake, California
  in Logan, Utah
  in Ukiah, California
 KWQA-LP in Chico, California
  in Cartago, California
 KXLI in Moapa, Nevada
 KYAT in Gallup, New Mexico
 KZMJ in Gainesville, Texas
 WAOO-LP in Suwanee, Georgia
 WAQA-LP in Morganton, Georgia
  in Naples, Florida
 WBFW in Smith Mills, Kentucky
  in State College, Pennsylvania
 WBYZ in Baxley, Georgia
 WCCR-LP in Williamsburg, Kentucky
  in Hemlock, Michigan
  in Daytona Beach, Florida
  in Hatteras, North Carolina
 WDAC in Lancaster, Pennsylvania
  in Rutland, Vermont
  in Ely, Minnesota
  in Berlin, Connecticut
  in Woodbury, Georgia
  in Parker, Florida
 WGTK-FM in Greenville, South Carolina
  in Jackson, Alabama
 WHPY-FM in Bellevue, Tennessee
  in Topeka, Kansas
 WIPK in Calhoun, Georgia
 WJJZ in Irasburg, Vermont
 WJMN (FM) in Boston, Massachusetts
 WJOX-FM in Birmingham, Alabama
  in Long Beach, Mississippi
 WKLQ in Holland, Michigan
  in Ellsworth, Maine
 WKTI in Milwaukee, Wisconsin
  in Leland, North Carolina
  in Champaign, Illinois
 WMCZ-LP in Camilla, Georgia
 WMRW-LP in Warren, Vermont
  in Lexington, Kentucky
  in Buffalo, New York
 WNRA-LP in Hawk Pride, Alabama
  in Trenton, New Jersey
 WPTI in Eden, North Carolina
 WRGW-LP in Shawano, Wisconsin
  in Eagle River, Wisconsin
 WRMV-LP in Madison Heights, Virginia
  in Richmond, Virginia
 WRWO-LP in Ottawa, Illinois
 WRZR in Loogootee, Indiana
  in Bowman, South Carolina
 WSQF-LP in Key Biscayne, Florida
  in Murrells Inlet, South Carolina
  in Tomah, Wisconsin
 WUMO-LP in Montgomery, Alabama
 WVGK-LP in Miami, Florida
 WVHO-LP in Nanticoke, Pennsylvania
  in Pittsburgh, Pennsylvania
  in Port Clinton, Ohio
 WYDB in Englewood, Ohio
  in Ravena, New York
 WYNL in Dunbar, West Virginia
 WYPV in Mackinaw City, Michigan
  in Syracuse, New York

References 

Lists of radio stations by frequency